Life Goes On is an American drama television series that aired on ABC from September 12, 1989, to May 23, 1993. The show centers on the Thatcher family living in suburban Chicago: Drew, his wife Libby, and their children Paige, Rebecca and Charles, who is known as Corky. Life Goes On was the first television series to have a major character with Down syndrome.

Cast and characters

Main
 Bill Smitrovich as Andrew "Drew" Thatcher:
Drew is the husband of Libby Thatcher and the father of Paige, Corky, and Becca Thatcher. He is a Special Olympics coach who formerly worked for a construction company before going into the restaurant business.
 Patti LuPone as Elizabeth "Libby" Thatcher:
Drew's wife, Paige's stepmother, and Corky and Becca's mother, who has been a singer and actress. She is very supportive of Corky and proud that Corky and Becca take part in their church's drama group and that Becca is in her school's drama club. At the end of Season 2, she gives birth to her and Drew's third child, a son named Nicholas.
Monique Lanier (season 1); Tracey Needham (seasons 2-4), as Paige Thatcher: 
Drew's daughter, Libby's stepdaughter, and Corky and Becca's older half-sister. Paige frequently dates men of whom her father does not approve. She is very caring of Corky but has a love-hate relationship with Becca.
 Chris Burke as Corky Thatcher:
Corky is the middle child: younger brother of Paige and older brother of Becca. Despite having Down Syndrome, he takes mostly regular classes in high school. He occasionally struggles, and indicated that mathematics was his hardest subject, but he improves through tutoring sessions.
 Kellie Martin as Rebecca "Becca" Thatcher:
Becca is the younger sister of Corky and Paige. She is nerdy but attractive; at school she is socially awkward, especially around her crushes, such as Tyler and Jesse.
Tommy Puett (recurring, season 1; main, seasons 2-3) as Tyler Benchfield: Corky's best friend and Becca's first boyfriend. He dies from drinking and driving in his last appearance.
Chad Lowe (recurring, season 3; main, season 4) as Jesse McKenna: Becca's second boyfriend.

Recurring
Ray Buktenica (guest, season 1; recurring, seasons 2-3) as Jerry Berkson, Libby's boss at Berkson & Berkson, an advertising agency. Jerry is eccentric and somewhat egomaniacal; he never fails to show his temper, but Libby always stands up to him. Jerry later becomes a partner in Drew's restaurant, The Glen Brook Grill.
Tanya Fenmore (seasons 1-3) as Maxie, Becca's best friend. Maxie leaves early in season 3 for a study-abroad in Paris and is never seen again.
Michele Matheson (seasons 1-2) as Rona Lieberman, a popular girl at school who is Becca's rival and a love interest for Tyler.
David Byrd (guest, season 1; recurring, seasons 2-4) as Hans, a chef who works at the Glen Brook Grill. He is a German immigrant.
Mary Page Keller (season 2) as Gina Giordano, Libby's sister, who comes to live in the Thatcher household for a time.
Leigh Ann Orsi (season 2) as Zoe, Gina's daughter, who comes to live in the Thatcher household for a time.
Troy Evans (seasons 3-4) as Artie McDonald, a welding foreman and Paige's boss at Stollmark Industries. In season 4, Artie and Paige are laid off from the Stollmark factory and they launch a contracting business together.
Lance Guest (seasons 3-4) as Michael Romanov, a welder and artist. He is Paige's co-worker at Stollmark Industries and becomes her love interest.
Andrea Friedman (seasons 3-4) as Amanda Swanson, Corky's girlfriend, a college student. Like Corky, Amanda also has Down Syndrome. Early in season 4, Corky and Amanda elope, which comes as a shock to their families.
Kiersten Warren (season 4) as Kathy Goodman, Becca's friend and co-worker at a bookstore. She is usually referred to by her last name only. A recent high school dropout, Goodman is convinced by Becca to enroll at Marshall High, which she does during their senior year, after having quit a previous school.

Guest stars
Al Ruscio as Sal Giordano, Libby's father
Penny Santon as Teresa Giordano, Libby's mother
Gloria Gifford as Mrs. Kneffer, principal of Marshall High
Gina Hecht as Angela, Libby's cousin, an attorney
Rick Rosenthal as Richard Thatcher, Drew's brother
Peter Van Norden (seasons 1-3) as Coach Paintz Kutner, a former classmate of Drew's
Alan Blumenfeld (seasons 1-3) as John Khatchadourian, a former classmate of Drew's
Whip Hubley as Dr. Oliver Matthews (season 1), the veterinarian that Paige works for, and as Coach Eric Bradford (season 2), a gymnastics coach at Marshall High.
Michael Rankin as Donnie Benchfield, Tyler's younger brother who has Down Syndrome.
Michael Alldredge as Mr. Seedling
Alfred Dennis as Miller
Shannen Doherty (season 1) as Ginny Green, a new student in school whom Corky has a crush on
Adam Carl (season 1-2) as Matt Hardy, a friend of Becca's whom she briefly dates
Viveca Lindfors (season 1) as Mrs. Doubcha, Becca's dance instructor
Elyssa Davalos (season 2) as Doreen Gillespie, a waitress at the Glen Brook Grill
Barney Martin (seasons 3-4) as Stan Baker, owner of the movie theater where Corky works
Mitzi McCall (season 3) as Midge, a waitress at the Glen Brook Grill
Dorothy Lyman (seasons 3-4) as Mary McKenna, Jesse's mother
Steven Eckholdt (season 3) as Kenny Stollmark, Jr., son of the Stollmark Industries president. He becomes romantically involved with Paige and they nearly get married.
Drew Snyder (seasons 3-4) as Bill Swanson, Amanda's father
Charlotte Stewart (seasons 3-4) as Collette Swanson, Amanda's mother
Ned Vaughn (season 4) as Eric, manager of the bookstore where Becca works. He has romantic feelings for Becca.
Martin Milner (season 4) as Harris Cassidy, owner of the bookstore where Becca works
Michael Goorjian (season 4) as Ray Nelson, a classmate of Becca's
Christopher and Kevin Graves (season 4) as Nicholas Thatcher
Richard Frank (season 4) as Chester, a patient that Jesse meets while being hospitalized for the effects of AIDS

Overview
The drama featured the Thatcher family, whose son, Charles "Corky" Thatcher (played by Chris Burke), has Down syndrome, while their daughter Becca (played by Kellie Martin) did well at school but was socially awkward. Tony Award-winning stage actress Patti LuPone played the mother Elizabeth ("Libby") and Bill Smitrovich played the father Drew. Eldest sister Paige Thatcher was played by Monique Lanier during the 1989–1990 seasons and by Tracey Needham during the 1990–1993 seasons as Lanier left the series to have a child. Becca's boyfriend and Corky's buddy, Tyler Benchfield, was played by Tommy Puett. Jerry Berkson (Ray Buktenica) was Libby's quirky boss. In the last two seasons, Becca's boyfriend Jesse McKenna was played by Chad Lowe.

The show is set in the Chicago suburb Glenbrook, Illinois, which is named after the high school which one of Braverman's children attended at the time. The name itself is a blend of the real suburbs served by the school, Glenview and Northbrook.

Each episode's opening credits end with a shot of Arnold, the family dog (billed as "Arnold the Semi-Wonder Dog"). Apparently forgotten by the family in their rush to get ready for the day, he sits in the kitchen with his empty food bowl in his mouth and lets it drop to the floor. The show's producers received a constant trickle of letters each week from viewers who thought this was cruel, so in the final episode's opening credits, a bag of dog food spills out of a nearby cabinet.

Early seasons
During the show's first year, the main focus was on Corky. Much of the show examined the challenges of a family whose son had Down Syndrome. The Thatchers sought to have Corky interact with regular society after spending years socializing him amongst other kids with Down syndrome in "special" classes. The need to integrate Corky into normal society was Season 1's main storyline, as the Thatchers opted to enroll Corky in a regular high school despite the principal's demand that he be placed in an alternative program for those with Down syndrome. 
 
In addition, during the first three seasons, episodes included Tyler Benchfield (Tommy Puett), Becca's high school crush, who also had a brother with Down syndrome.

Corky eventually got a job as an usher at a local movie theater. He later found a girlfriend, Amanda Swanson (Andrea Friedman), who also had Down Syndrome. They married by the series' end.

Later seasons
By the second season, the writers began to expand the show's scope beyond Corky, and the third and fourth seasons centered on Becca and a new character, Jesse (Chad Lowe), a junior who met Becca through the school's theatre department. As they become friends, Jesse told Becca he was HIV positive. Tyler became less prominent in Becca's life and was jealous of Becca's closeness with Jesse. His character was written out and he was given the memorable sendoff of dying in a car accident with Corky as passenger.

Much to the surprise of those around them, Becca and Jesse began a relationship despite his HIV. The writers explored life with HIV through Jesse's character, and the difficulties the disease causes with romantic relationships. The relationship between Corky and Becca, previously portrayed as close, was also explored, as Corky briefly turned his back on his sister for dumping a mutual friend to date Jesse.

The fourth season's first episode, in which a 40-something Becca (Pamela Bellwood) tours the house she grew up in while remembering the events of 25 years earlier, establishes that Jesse would ultimately die from AIDS and that Becca would move on and marry a man named David. The series itself ended ambiguously but on an upbeat note, showing Becca five years later, married with a son named Jesse.  In the final episode Corky was set to graduate from high school, but he did not because the school board did not waive the math requirement.

Episodes

Season 1 (1989–90)

Season 2 (1990–91)

Season 3 (1991–92)

Season 4 (1992–93)

Broadcast history and U.S. television ratings 

In Canada, the show aired on Crossroads Television System. In New Zealand, the show aired Saturday afternoons on TVNZ's Channel 2.

In the United States, reruns have previously aired on The Family Channel, FX and PAX TV.

Awards and nominations

Home media
On May 9, 2006, Warner Home Video released Season 1 of Life Goes On on DVD in Region 1. It is unknown if the remaining three seasons will be released. The DVD release has a replacement theme song at the beginning of each episode, with the exception of the show's pilot. The replacement was due to high licensing costs for the Beatles' song "Ob-La-Di, Ob-La-Da." The new song aptly titled "Life Goes On" was written by composer Marc Jackson of MoonLab Music and sung by singer/songwriter Tara Johnston. The song was written specifically for the DVD release.

Possible sequel
In September 2021, it was reported that a possible sequel series with original cast member Kellie Martin, Chad Lowe and Nkechi Okoro Carroll is in the works. In January 2022, it was announced that NBC had given a pilot commitment for a sequel series with Martin set to return as star. Carroll will write and executive produce under her production company Rocky My Soul Productions banner, Lindsay Dunn will also executive produce, while Martin and Lowe will produce.

References

External links 
 

1989 American television series debuts
1993 American television series endings
1980s American drama television series
1990s American drama television series
American Broadcasting Company original programming
Primetime Emmy Award-winning television series
Television series by Warner Bros. Television Studios
HIV/AIDS in television
Down syndrome in television
Television shows set in Illinois
English-language television shows